aka  is a 2003 Japanese action-adventure, science-fiction-themed pink film directed by Minoru Kunizawa. It was chosen as the fourth best pink film release of the year at the Pink Grand Prix. Other awards won by the film at the ceremony include Best Director, Best Screenplay, Best Actress 3rd Place, and Best Cinematography. The story is a satire of the U.S. Marvel Comics superhero team, X-Men.

In the movie, a female high school student discovers she has supernatural powers during an attack. Her first use of her power is to vaporize her attacker. Years later, her powers manifest themselves whenever she is sexually aroused by her husband. She is transported to another dimension where she engages in nude battles with opponents. The role of Kageyama is played by Thunder Sugiyama, former IWA World Heavyweight Champion.

Irresistable Angel: Suck It All Up was released theatrically on October 10, 2003. Jasper Sharp writes that Irresistable Angel: Suck It All Up is an "innovative and sexy" take on the X-Men story. The Japanese pink film community also gave the film high marks, naming it the 4th Best Film of the year at the Pink Grand Prix. For their work on the film, the Pink Grand Prix also awarded Minoru Kunizawa for Best Director, Tatsurō Kashihara for Best Screenplay, Ruri Tachibana for Best Actress 3rd Place, and Takuya Hasegawa for Best Cinematography.

Bibliography

Notes

External links
 

2003 films
2000s erotic films
Films directed by Minoru Kunizawa
2000s Japanese-language films
OP Eiga films
Pink films
2000s Japanese films